Pimelea, commonly known as rice flowers,  is a genus of plants belonging to the family Thymelaeaceae. There are about 150 species, including 110 in Australia and 36 in New Zealand.

Description
Plants in the genus Pimelea are herbs or small shrubs, usually with leaves arranged in opposite pairs. The leaves are usually paler on the lower surface and the petiole is usually very short. The flowers are usually arranged in groups on the ends of the branches and have no petals, but four petal-like sepals and two stamens. The ovary has a single ovule and the fruit is usually a nut containing a single seed.

Taxonomy and naming
The genus Pimelea was first formally described in 1788 by Joseph Gaertner from unpublished descriptions by Joseph Banks and Daniel Solander. The first species Gaertner described was Pimelea laevigata, now known as Pimelea prostrata.

The name Pimelea is from the Ancient Greek word pimele, meaning "fat or "lard", possibly referring to the oily seeds or fleshy cotyledons of riceflowers.

Ecology
Some species, including P. curviflora, P. flava, P. glauca, P. linifolia, P. microcephala, P. neo-anglica, P. pauciflora, P. simplex and P. trichostachya, are toxic to stock; there is no known cure.

Species
About 150 species of Pimelea have been formally described, including about 110 in Australia and 36 in New Zealand. The following is a combined list of names accepted by the Australian Plant Census or the New Zealand Plant Conservation Network as of December 2021.

Pimelea acra  C.J.Burrows & de Lange (N.Z.)
Pimelea actea  C.J.Burrows (N.Z.)
Pimelea aeruginosa F.Muell. (W.A.)
Pimelea alpina  F.Muell. ex Meisn. – alpine riceflower (N.S.W., Vic.)
Pimelea altior F.Muell. (Qld., N.S.W.)
Pimelea amabilis (Domin) A.R.Bean  (Qld.)
Pimelea ammocharis F.Muell. (W.A.)
Pimelea angustifolia R.Br. (W.A.)
Pimelea approximans A.R.Bean (Qld.)
Pimelea aquilonia Rye (Qld.)
Pimelea argentea R.Br. – silvery leaved pimelea (W.A.)
Pimelea aridula Cheeseman (N.Z.) 
Pimelea avonensis Rye (W.A.)
Pimelea axiflora F.Muell. ex Meisn. – bootlace bush (N.S.W., Vic., Tas.)
Pimelea axiflora subsp. alpina
Pimelea axiflora subsp. axiflora
Pimelea axiflora subsp. pubescens
Pimelea barbata C.J.Burrows  (N.Z.)
Pimelea biflora N.A.Wakef. – matted rice flower (N.S.W.,Vic.)
Pimelea brachyphylla Benth. (W.A.)
Pimelea bracteata Threlfall (N.S.W.)
Pimelea brevifolia R.Br. (W.A.)
Pimelea brevifolia subsp. brevifolia
Pimelea brevifolia subsp. modesta
Pimelea brevistyla Rye (W.A.)
Pimelea brevistyla subsp. brevistyla
Pimelea brevistyla subsp. minor
Pimelea buxifolia Hook.f. (N.Z.)
Pimelea calcicola Rye (W.A.)
Pimelea carnosa C.J.Burrows (N.Z.)
Pimelea chlorina A.R.Bean (Qld.)
Pimelea ciliata Rye (W.A.)
Pimelea ciliata subsp. ciliata
Pimelea ciliata subsp. longituba
Pimelea ciliolaris (Threlfall) Rye (N.S.W.)
Pimelea cinerea R.Br. (Tas.)
Pimelea clavata Labill. (W.A.)
Pimelea concinna Allan (N.Z.)
Pimelea concreta F.Muell. (W.A., N.T.)
Pimelea confertiflora A.R.Bean (Qld.)
Pimelea congesta C.Moore & F.Muell. (Lord Howe Island)
Pimelea cornucopiae Vahl (Qld.)
Pimelea cracens Rye (W.A.)
Pimelea cracens subsp. cracens
Pimelea cracens subsp. glabra
Pimelea cremnophila L.M.Copel. & I.Telford (N.S.W.)
Pimelea cryptica C.J.Burrows & Enright (N.Z.)
Pimelea curviflora R.Br. – tough-barked riceflower, curved riceflower (N.S.W., Vic., S.A.)
Pimelea curviflora var. acuta Threlfall
Pimelea curviflora R.Br. var. curviflora
Pimelea curviflora var. divergens Threlfall
Pimelea curviflora var. gracilis (R.Br.) Threlfall
Pimelea curviflora var. sericea Benth.
Pimelea curviflora var. subglabrata Threlfall
Pimelea declivis C.J.Burrows (N.Z.)
Pimelea decora Domin – Flinders poppy (Qld.)
Pimelea drummondii (Turcz.) Rye (W.A.)
Pimelea drupacea Labill. – cherry riceflower (Vic., Tas.)
Pimelea dura C.J.Burrows (N.Z.)
Pimelea elongata Threlfall (N.S.W., Qld., S.A.)
Pimelea erecta Rye (W.A.)
Pimelea eyrei F.Muell. (W.A.)
Pimelea eremitica C.J.Burrows – roimata o tohe (N.Z.)
Pimelea ferruginea Labill. (W.A.)
Pimelea filifolia (Rye) C.S.P.Foster & Henwood (N.T.)
Pimelea filiformis Hook.f. (Tas.)
Pimelea flava R.Br. – yellow riceflower, diosma riceflower (N.S.W., Vic. S.A.)
Pimelea flava subsp. dichotoma
Pimelea flava subsp. flava
Pimelea floribunda Meisn. (W.A.)
Pimelea forrestiana F.Muell. (W.A.)
Pimelea fugiens A.R.Bean (Qld.)
Pimelea gigandra A.R.Bean (Qld., N.S.W.) 
Pimelea gilgiana E.Pritz. (W.A.)
Pimelea glauca R.Br. – smooth riceflower (N.S.W., Qld., Tas., S.A.)
Pimelea gnidia (J.R.Forst. et G.Forst.) Willd. (N.Z.)
Pimelea graniticola Rye (W.A.)
Pimelea haematostachya F.Muell. (Qld.)
Pimelea halophila Rye (W.A.)
Pimelea hewardiana Meisn. – forked riceflower (Vic., S.A.)
Pimelea hirta C.J.Burrows (N.Z.)
Pimelea hirsuta Meisn. (N.S.W.)
Pimelea hirsuta subsp. elliptifolia
Pimelea hirsuta subsp. hirsuta
Pimelea hispida R.Br.  – bristly pimelea (W.A.)
Pimelea holroydii F.Muell.(W.A.)
Pimelea humilis R.Br.– common riceflower (N.S.W., Vic., Tas., S.A.)
Pimelea ignota C.J.Burrows & Courtney – pinatoro (N.Z.)
Pimelea imbricata R.Br. (W.A.)
Pimelea imbricata var. imbricata
Pimelea imbricata var. major
Pimelea imbricata var. petraea
Pimelea imbricata var. piligera
Pimelea imbricata var. simulans
Pimelea interioris Rye (N.T.)
Pimelea lanata R.Br. (W.A.)
Pimelea latifolia R.Br. (N.S.W., Qld.)
Pimelea lehmanniana Meisn. (W.A.)
Pimelea lehmanniana subsp. lehmanniana
Pimelea lehmanniana subsp. nervosa
Pimelea leiophylla A.M.Gray & M.Baker (Tas.)
Pimelea leptospermoides F.Muell. (Qld.)
Pimelea leptospermoides subsp. bowmanii
Pimelea leptospermoides subsp. leptospermoides
Pimelea leptostachya Benth. (Qld.)
Pimelea leucantha Diels (W.A.)
Pimelea ligustrina Labill. – tall riceflower (N.S.W., Qld., Vic., Tas., S.A.)
Pimelea ligustrina subsp. ciliata
Pimelea ligustrina subsp. hypericina
Pimelea ligustrina subsp. ligustrina
Pimelea linifolia Sm. – slender riceflower (N.S.W., Qld., S.A., Vic., Tas.)
Pimelea linifolia subsp. caesia
Pimelea linifolia subsp. collina
Pimelea linifolia subsp. linifolia
Pimelea linifolia subsp. linoides'Pimelea longiflora R.Br. (W.A.)Pimelea longiflora subsp. longifloraPimelea longifolia Sol. ex Wikstr. – long-leaved pimelea, taranga (N.Z.)Pimelea lyallii Hook.f. (N.Z.)Pimelea macrostegia (Benth.) J.M.Black (S.A.)Pimelea mesoa C.J.Burrows (N.Z.)Pimelea micrantha F.Muell. ex Meisn. – silky rice-flower (N.S.W., Vic., W.A., S.A., Tas.)Pimelea microcephala R.Br. – mallee riceflower or shrubby riceflower (N.S.W., Qld., Vic., N.T., S.A., W.A.)Pimelea microcephala subsp. glabraPimelea microcephala subsp. microcephalaPimelea microphylla Colenso (N.Z.)Pimelea milliganii Meisn. (Tas.)Pimelea mimosa C.J.Burrows (N.Z.)Pimelea mollis A.R.Bean (Qld.)Pimelea neoanglica Threlfall – poison pimelea, scanty riceflower (N.S.W., Qld.)Pimelea neokyrea Rye (W.A.)Pimelea nitens C.J.Burrows & Courtney (N.Z.)Pimelea nivea Labill. (Tas.)Pimelea notia C.J.Burrows & Thorsen (N.Z.)Pimelea octophylla R.Br. – woolly riceflower, downy riceflower (Vic., S.A.)Pimelea oreophila C.J.Burrows (N.Z.)Pimelea orthia C.J.Burrows & Thorsen (N.Z.)Pimelea pagophila Rye (Vic.)Pimelea pauciflora R.Br. – poison rice-flower (N.S.W., Vic., Tas.)Pimelea pelinos Rye (W.A.)Pimelea pendens Rye (W.A.)Pimelea penicillaris F.Muell. (N.S.W., Qld., S.A., N.T.)Pimelea petrophila F.Muell. (S.A., N.S.W.)Pimelea phylicoides (Vic., S.A.)Pimelea physodes Hook.f. – Qualup bell (W.A.)Pimelea plurinervia Bean (Qld.)Pimelea poppelwellii Petrie – Poppelwells pimelea (N.Z.)Pimelea preissii Meisn. (W.A.)Pimelea prostrata (J.R.Forst. et G.Forst.) Willd. – pinatoro, New Zealand daphne, Strathmore weed (N.Z.)Pimelea pseudolyallii Allan (N.Z.)Pimelea punicea R.Br. (W.A.)Pimelea pygmaea F.Muell. & C.Stuart ex Meisn. (Tas.)Pimelea rara – summer pimelea (W.A.)Pimelea rosea – rose banjine (W.A.)Pimelea rosea subsp. annelsiiPimelea rosea subsp. roseaPimelea rupestris (Qld., N.S.W.)Pimelea sanguinea (W.A.)Pimelea sericea (Tas.)Pimelea sericostachya (Qld.)Pimelea sericostachya subsp. amabilisPimelea sericostachya subsp. sericostachyaPimelea sericeovillosa – cushion pimelea (N.Z.)Pimelea serpyllifolia – thyme riceflower (N.S.W., Vic., Tas., W.A., S.A.)Pimelea serpyllifolia subsp. occidentalisPimelea serpyllifolia subsp. serpyllifoliaPimelea sessilis (W.A.)Pimelea simplex – desert riceflower (N.S.W., Qld., Vic., S.A.)Pimelea simplex subsp. continuaPimelea simplex subsp. simplexPimelea spectabilis – bunjong (W.A.)Pimelea spicata (N.S.W.)Pimelea spiculigera (W.A.)Pimelea spiculigera var. spiculigeraPimelea spiculigera var. thesioidesPimelea spinescens – spiny riceflower (Vic.)Pimelea spinescens subsp. pubifloraPimelea spinescens subsp. spinescensPimelea sporadica (N.Z.)Pimelea stricta (N.S.W., Vic., Tas., S.A.)Pimelea strigosa (N.S.W., Qld.)Pimelea suaveolens – scented banjine (W.A.)Pimelea suaveolens subsp. flavaPimelea suaveolens subsp. suaveolensPimelea subvillifera (W.A.)Pimelea sulphurea – yellow banjine (W.A.)Pimelea suteri (N.Z.)Pimelea sylvestris (W.A.)Pimelea telura – three kings pimelea (N.Z.)Pimelea tinctoria (W.A.)Pimelea tomentosa (N.Z.)Pimelea traversii (N.Z.)Pimelea treyvaudii – grey riceflower (N.S.W., Vic.)Pimelea trichostachya (N.S.W., Qld., Vic., W.A., S.A., N.T.)Pimelea umbricata (Qld.)Pimelea urvilleana subsp. nesica (N.Z.)Pimelea urvilleana subsp. urvilleana – pinatoro (N.Z.)Pimelea venosa – Bolivia Hill pimelea (N.S.W.)Pimelea villifera (W.A.)Pimelea villosa – sand daphne, autetaranga, toroheke, sand pimelea (N.Z.)Pimelea williamsonii – Williamson's riceflower (Vic., S.A.)Pimelea xenica'' – pinatoro (N.Z.)

References

 
Malvales genera
Taxa named by Joseph Gaertner